Alice Fitoussi (May 9, 1916 – 1998) was an Algerian singer and musician of Jewish origin, born in Bordj Bou Arréridj, French Algeria. She is known for her songs in the Andalusian and hawzii style during Algeria's pre-independence period.

Fitoussi was the daughter of Rahmim Fitoussi, a singer and violinist, and she learned her craft from him. She released her first record at the age of thirteen.

During the early twentieth century in Algeria, music was a multicultural affair, with Jewish and Muslim musicians sharing a long musical history in the region. Women were increasingly present in this musical community but were often seen as controversial. Jewish women like Fitoussi and her peers, such as Reinette L'Oranaise, were not subject to as much gender-based discrimination as Muslim female singers saw at the time.

Despite religious differences, Fitoussi often performed with and for Muslims. To cater to Islamic cultural practices, Fitoussi catered these performances to the audience. She utilized an all-female accompanying orchestra when performing for Muslim women, and performed only with males when the audience consisted of Muslim men. Notably, she is thought to be the only Jewish singer of the period who performed Medh, poetic songs in honor of the Prophet Mohammed, for an Arab-Muslim audience.

Alice Fitoussi was one of a handful of Algerian Jewish musicians to remain in Algeria after independence in 1962. 

In 2006, some of her recordings were re-released to reach a broader audience as part of the Trésors de la Chanson Judéo-Arabe (Treasures of Jewish-Arab song) series from Mélodie Distribution.

References

1916 births
People from Bordj Bou Arréridj
Algerian Jews
Jewish singers
20th-century Algerian women singers
1978 deaths
Jewish women musicians